Elks Lodge Building may refer to:

 Elks Lodge Building (Flint, Michigan)
 Elks Lodge Building (Oklahoma City)

See also
 List of Elks buildings